Giovanni Battista Cavazza was an Italian painter and engraver, who was born at Bologna about the year 1620. He studied under Cavedone and Guido, and painted some pictures for public buildings at Bologna. The church of the Nunziata has frescoes of saints painted by him. He engraved the following plates from his own designs:

The Crucifixion.
The Resurrection.
The Death of St. Joseph.
The Assumption of the Virgin.

References
 Bryan, Michael. 1903. Bryan's Dictionary of Painters and Engravers. London England: G. Bell and Sons.

Year of birth unknown
Year of death unknown
Artists from Bologna
17th-century Italian painters
Italian male painters
Italian engravers